The Humanist Party of Guatemala is a political party in Guatemala.

History
The Humanist Party was registered before the Supreme Electoral Tribunal on January 17, 2017. Its general secretary is Rudio Lecsan Mérida, former director of the National Civil Police during the government of Alfonso Portillo, and the leader of the Humanist Party is the Guatemalan diplomat and politician Edmond Mulet. The process of constituting the party ended on January 16, 2019. It has more than 23,840 members. In September 2018, the political organization completed the requirements and was made an official political party in the same month.

The party supports the withdrawal of Guatemala from the Central American Parliament.

In January 2020, the Humanist Party declared itself "in opposition" to the government of Alejandro Giammattei, but within a few months the party became part of the ruling coalition. Mulet denounced the act and resigned his membership of the party.

Electoral results

President of the Republic of Guatemala

Legislative elections

References

External links
Plan for Governing

2018 establishments in Guatemala
Political parties established in 2018
Political parties in Guatemala
Humanist Party